The Hawaiian Chinese News, also known as New Honolulu Journal, Tan Shan Hsin Pao, Lung Kee Sun Bo,  was a Chinese language commercial newspaper in Honolulu, USA. It was founded by Cheng Weinan in 1881, initially called the Lung Chi Pao (隆記報), renamed Tan Shan Hsin Pao (檀山新報) in 1903.

The earliest known preserved issue of the Hawaiian Chinese News, with the date of April 13, 1889, contains a report on the political situation in Samoa. It was the first Chinese language newspaper in Honolulu.

Hawaiian Chinese News was the voice of Sun Yat-sen and his revolutionary party. In 1907, the newspaper ceased publication.

References

Publications established in 1881
Defunct newspapers published in Hawaii
Publications disestablished in 1907
Chinese-language newspapers published in the United States